Nowruzlu (also Romanized as Nowrūzlū; also known as Nowrūzābād) is a village in Chaharduli Rural District, Keshavarz District, Shahin Dezh County, West Azerbaijan Province, Iran. At the 2006 census, its population was 22, in 4 families.

References 

Populated places in Shahin Dezh County